4MyCiTy is a Maryland-based 501(c)(3) non-profit organization that promotes environmental sustainability through the diversion of potential food waste. 4MyCiTy was founded in 2018 by Christopher Dipnarine with a major focus on reducing food waste and limiting the harmful effects caused by organic waste on our environmental while improving food security for families within the communities.

Background 
4MyCiTy was launched by Christopher Dipnarine in October, 2018 and received its non-profit status on August 30, 2019, with its headquarters in Baltimore, Maryland. All members of the Board of Directors are volunteers, and their focus area is in the state of Maryland with a concentration on Baltimore City. 4MyCiTy also has distribution operations in Washington DC, Virginia, New Jersey, New York, Ohio, Michigan, Pennsylvania and Florida. Since its inception, 4MyCiTy has diverted over 180 million pounds of food to families facing hunger, which estimates to be 150 million meals, and holds a Platinum Seal of transparency from charity rating organization Guidestar, Candid.

References

External links 
 Official website
 Forbes Nonprofit Council Profile
 Charity Navigator
 GuideStar

2019 establishments in Maryland
Organizations based in Baltimore
Non-profit organizations based in Maryland
Hunger relief organizations
Environment and society
Sustainability and environmental management
Sustainability